This is a list of films which have placed number one at the weekend box office in Italy during 2013.

References

 

Italy